All Saints Church, East Sheen, is a church in the London Borough of Richmond upon Thames, located at the junction of East Sheen Avenue and Park Avenue in East Sheen. All Saints Church is a member of the Anglican Communion and the Church of England and the style of worship is Modern Catholic. There are three regular Sunday services at 8:00am, 10:00am and at midday.

The building

Built to serve the growing suburb of East Sheen, the building's foundation stone was laid on 28 October 1928 by Elizabeth Bowes-Lyon (who was then the Duchess of York and later became Queen Elizabeth The Queen Mother).

The church was built on land bequeathed under the will of Major Shepherd-Cross, MP for Bolton, who lived at nearby Palewell Lodge from 1896 until his death in 1913. It was consecrated on All Saints' Day 1929.

The architects were J E Newberry & C W Fowler.

Fire destroyed much of the nave in 1963, and the roof was later rebuilt.

The building includes a stained glass window commemorating Suzy Lamplugh, the estate agent who went missing in 1986, and who was, with her family, a member of All Saints congregation. The window was installed in her memory in 1996.

The terracotta Stations of the Cross were sculpted by  Nathan David.

The church has a lady chapel which is used for the early morning service on Sundays and for other services during the week. There is also a church hall.

References

External links
 Official website
 Southwark Diocese website

1929 establishments in England
East Sheen
East Sheen
East Sheen